Business Today is a Philippine television public affairs show broadcast by GMA Network. Hosted by Karen Davila, Rico Hizon, Dong Puno and Mon Isberto, it premiered on October 1, 1990. The show concluded on March 29, 1996.

1990 Philippine television series debuts
1996 Philippine television series endings
English-language television shows
GMA Network original programming
GMA Integrated News and Public Affairs shows
Philippine television shows